The Coordinating Working Party on Fishery Statistics (CWP) provides a mechanism to coordinate fishery statistical programmes of regional fishery bodies and other inter-governmental organizations with a remit for fishery statistics.

Main function 
Functional since 1960, the CWP's purpose is to:
 continually review fishery statistics requirements for research, policy-making and management;
 agree on standard concepts, definitions, classifications and methodologies for the collection and collation of fishery statistics;
 make proposals for the coordination and streamlining of statistical activities among relevant intergovernmental organizations.

Legal Framework 
Established by resolution 23/59 of the FAO Conference under Article VI-2 of the Organization's Constitution at its Tenth Session in 1959. The Statutes of CWP were amended and approved by the FAO Council at its Hundred and Eighth Session in June 1995.

Participating Organizations 
The CWP is composed of experts nominated by intergovernmental organizations which have a competence in fishery statistics. There are currently 17 participating organizations in the CWP:
 Commission for the Conservation of Antarctic Marine Living Resources (CCAMLR)
 Commission for the Conservation of Southern Bluefin Tuna (CCSBT)
 Food and Agriculture Organization of the United Nations (FAO)
 General Fisheries Commission for the Mediterranean (GFCM)
 Indian Ocean Tuna Commission  (IOTC)
 Inter-American Tropical Tuna Commission
 International Commission for the Conservation of Atlantic Tunas (ICCAT)
 International Council for the Exploration of the Sea (ICES)
 International Whaling Commission (IWC)
 North Atlantic Salmon Conservation Organization (NASCO)
 North East Atlantic Fisheries Commission (NEAFC)
 Northwest Atlantic Fisheries Organization (NAFO)
 Organisation for Economic Cooperation and Development (OECD)
 Secretariat of the Pacific Community (SPC)
 Southeast Asian Fisheries Development Center (SEAFDEC)
 Statistical Office of the European Communities (Commission of the EU/Eurostat)
 Western and Central Pacific Fisheries Commission (WCPFC)

Secretariat 
The FAO serves as the CWP Secretariat. The CWP meets in full session approximately every two years and carries out intersessional and ad hoc meetings as required.

Geographical Coverage 
Although first mandated to cover North Atlantic fisheries, since 1995 the CWP has extended its remit to all marine water bodies.

Languages 
 English

References

Bibliography 
The Coordinating Working Party on Fishery Statistics: Its Origin, Role and Structure FAO Fisheries Circular No.903. Rome, December 1995.

External links 
CWP website
CWP Handbook of Fishery Statistical Standards
FAO Fisheries&Aquaculture department website

Fisheries agencies
Fisheries law
Statistical data agreements
Statistical organizations